Kalankar Lake (Urdu کلانکر جھیل) is situated near Dhoronaro village of Umerkot, Sindh, Pakistan. The lake is spread over both Sanghar and Umerkot districts. It starts from Sanghar near Ghulam Nabi Shah town where barrage and desert lands meet and ends at Umerkot district.

To reach Kalankar Lake, there is one-hour journey from  Umerkot to Dhoronaro, a rural town 30 kilometers away and from Dhorono village another eight kilometers away in Haji Khamiso Rajar village.

References

Lakes of Sindh
Marine parks of Pakistan
Protected areas of Sindh
Umerkot District
Sanghar District